Seventh Heaven (Swedish: Sjunde himlen) is a 1956 Swedish comedy film directed by Hasse Ekman and starring Sickan Carlsson, Ekman and Gunnar Björnstrand. It was shot at the Råsunda Studios in Stockholm. The film's sets were designed by the art director P.A. Lundgren. It was followed by a sequel Heaven and Pancake in 1959.

Plot summary 
Willy Lorens is a successful radio idol with the hit series "Seventh Heaven". But the amount of fan mail and attention eventually becomes too much for Lorens, who suffers a minor collapse. He is taken to hospital where he meets Dr. Lovisa Sundelius, virtually the only woman in Sweden who does not admire the radio idol. In fact she despises him.

Since the program still has to air, according to the radio company, Lorens gets a vitamin injection and get to broadcast the program from his hospital bed. Dr. Sundelius checks upon her patient, and to help him she improvise a part in the show, but does it too wild. The next day, the newspapers headlines write about the embarrassing blunder.

To get away from it all, Wily Lorens buys a bus ticket to a trip through Europe with Italy as the destination, but it just so happens that Lovisa Sundelius also has a ticket to that same bus ride. Along for the ride is also Lovisa Sundelius incredibly dull fiancé...

Cast
Sickan Carlsson as Lovisa Sundelius, doctor 
Hasse Ekman as Willy "Etershejken" Lorens, radio show host
Gunnar Björnstrand as squadron-leader Ernst C:son Kruuse, Lovisas fiancé 
Stig Järrel as Sture Turesson, radio producer
Sigge Fürst as radio writer
Inga Gill as Miss Jonasson, singer  
Torsten Winge as Torsten Tidström, watchmaker
Gunnar Sjöberg as father Bernhard Svanström, priest
Bellan Roos as Inez, Lovisas housekeeper
Doreen Denning as Lisa Brattström, travel guide
Solveig Svensson as Miss Jonasson, singer  
Ulla-Britt Svensson as Miss Jonasson, singer
 Alexander von Baumgarten as Nattklubbsägare 
 Gunnel Wadner as Sjuksyster 
 Astrid Bodin as Beundrarinna 
 Helga Brofeldt as 	Beundrarinna 
 Elsa Ebbesen as Översköterskan
 Lars Egge as 	Svenske ambassadören 
 Siv Ericks as 	Lovisas patient 
 Mona Geijer-Falkner as 	Beundrarinna 
 Erna Groth as 	Blenda från Kujala 
 Lars Kåge as Liljekvist 
 Stig Olin as 	Berättarröst
 John Melin as Ballongförsäljare 
 Hanny Schedin as 	Fru Andersson 
 Agda Helin as Beundrarinna

References

Bibliography 
 Iverson, Gunnar, Soderbergh Widding, Astrid & Soila, Tytti. Nordic National Cinemas. Routledge, 2005.
 Qvist, Per Olov & von Bagh, Peter. Guide to the Cinema of Sweden and Finland. Greenwood Publishing Group, 2000.

External links

1956 films
Swedish comedy films
Films directed by Hasse Ekman
1950s Swedish-language films
1956 comedy films
1950s Swedish films